Avatha bipartita is a species of moth of the family Erebidae. It is found in Taiwan.

References

Moths described in 1915
Avatha
Moths of Asia